This is a list of butterflies of Palau.

Hesperiidae

Coeliadinae
Badamia exclamationis  (Fabricius, 1775) 
Hasora chromus chromus  (Cramer, 1780)

Hesperiinae
Parnara bada  (Moore, 1878)

Papilionidae

Papilioninae
Graphium agamemnon enoplus  Jordan, 1909
Papilio polytes palewensis  Nakamura, 1933

Pieridae

Coliadinae
Catopsilia pomona  (Fabricius, 1775) 
Catopsilia pyranthe pyranthe  (Linnaeus, 1758) 
Eurema hecabe marginata  (Kishida, 1933) 
Eurema brigitta nebulosa  (Kishida, 1933)

Pierinae
Appias ada ardens  (Butler, 1898)

Lycaenidae

Theclinae
Bindahara phocides isabella  (C Felder, 1860)

Polyommatinae
Petrelaea tombugensis  (Röber, 1886) 
Prosotas dubiosa dubiosa  (Semper, 1879) 
Jamides bochus palauensis  (Fruhstorfer, 1915) 
Catochrysops panormus papuana  Tite, 1959
Lampides boeticus  (Linnaeus, 1767) 
Leptotes plinius pseudocassius  (Murray, 1873) 
Everes lacturnus pulchra  (Rothschild, 1915) 
Acytolepis puspa watasei   (Matsumura, 1915) 
Euchrysops cnejus cnidus  Waterhouse and Lyell, 1914

Nymphalidae

Danainae
Danaus affinis rubrica  (Fruhstorfer, 1907) 
Danaus plexippus plexippus  (Linnaeus, 1758) 
Euploea eunice kadu  (von Eschscholtz, 1821) 
Euploea algea abjecta  (Butler, 1866)

Satyrinae
Melanitis leda ponapensis  Mathew, 1889

Nymphalinae
Hypolimnas antilope anomala  (Wallace, 1869) 
Hypolimnas octocula arakalulk  (Semper, 1906) 
Hypolimnas bolina nerina  (Fabricius, 1775) 
Hypolimnas misippus  (Linnaeus, 1764) 
Junonia villida villida  (Fabricius, 1787) 
Junonia hedonia zelima  (Fabricius, 1775)

Heliconiinae
Vagrans egista brixia  (Fruhstorfer, 1912) 
Phalanta exulans  (Hopkins, 1927)

References
W.John Tennent: A checklist of the butterflies of Melanesia, Micronesia, Polynesia and some adjacent areas. Zootaxa 1178: 1-209 (21 Apr. 2006)

Palau
Palau
Butterflies
Palau
Palau